Zanefa Ngidi (born 5 February 1986) is a South African maskandi musician.

Early life and education
He was born 1986 in Embizeni, Kwa-Maphumulo, near the Kwa-Zulu Natal town of KwaDukuza. He finished his secondary education at Velangezwi High School.

Music career

Zanefa released more than four albums from 2010. He released his first album in 2010 titled Umona. The project got him a nomination for Best Maskandi Album of the Year at the 2011 SA Traditional Music Awards (SATMA Awards).

Discography

Studio  albums
 Umona (2010)
 Amangwinya (2011) 
 Ebusweni bencwadi (2012)
 Kwanompumelelo (2014)
 Umalum'umbavumbavu (2015)
 Abahambe Osbali (2017)
 Amahliphihliphi (2017)
 Inyoka yami (2020)

Awards and nominations

References

External links
 News24.com

1986 births
Living people
South African musicians